Konar Siah (also Romanized as Konār Sīāh; also known as Konārsīyāh) is a village in Shamil Rural District, Takht District, Bandar Abbas County, Hormozgan Province, Iran. At the 2006 census, its population was 23, in 5 families.

References 

Populated places in Bandar Abbas County